Ismail Sassi (born 24 December 1991) is a professional footballer who plays as a winger for Achyronas Onisilos, on loan from Doxa Katokopias. Born in France, he represents the Tunisia national team.

References

External links
 
 
 Ismail Sassi at Cypriot League Profile

Living people
1991 births
Footballers from Tunis
Association football midfielders
Tunisian footballers
Tunisian expatriate footballers
Expatriate footballers in France
Expatriate footballers in Cyprus
Tunisia international footballers
Tunisian expatriate sportspeople in France
Tunisian expatriate sportspeople in Cyprus
Cypriot First Division players
Cypriot Second Division players
Super League Greece players
US Raon-l'Étape players
FC Mantois 78 players
Othellos Athienou F.C. players
AEZ Zakakiou players
AEL Limassol players
OFI Crete F.C. players